This is a list of results for matches of the 2004 National Rugby League season.

Regular season

Finals series

Week One

First Qualifying Final

Second Qualifying Final

Third Qualifying Final

Fourth Qualifying Final

Week Two

First Semi Final

Second Semi Final

Week Three

First Preliminary Final

Second Preliminary Final

Grand final

See also 
 National Rugby League season 2004

External links 
 NRL official website
 Yahoo! Sport Australia/New Zealand (news)
 SportsAustralia (news and views)
 RLeague.com -- NRL
 Centrebet (current odds)
 Sportingbet Australia (current odds)

National Rugby League season results
Results